Krolevets is a city in Sumy Oblast, Ukraine. Population:  In 2001, population was 25,183.

History

Named in honor of the Polish King Sigismund III, Krolevets was founded in 1601 and it was originally part of Poland. The original name was written as Krolewac (Krulevats). In 1644 it was granted Magdeburg city rights by Polish King Władysław IV Vasa. Krolevets was annexed by the Tsardom of Russia in 1667 (Truce of Andrusovo). 

In 1802 it was incorporated into the Chernigov Governorate. 

A local newspaper is published in the city since 1919.

During World War II, Krolevets was occupied by the German Army from 3 September 1941 to 1 September 1943.

Transportation
Krolevets is situated on the Kyiv - Moscow railway and auto route. Distance from Kyiv - approx. . Distance to Russian border - approx. .

Nature

Krolevets is the location of a unique apple tree, which has self-propagated into a colony of fifteen family trees that combined cover an area of 1,000 sq. meters (10,763 sq.feet). This self-propagation, where drooping branches create new roots and trunks, has not been observed in other apple trees.

References

Cities in Sumy Oblast
Krolevetsky Uyezd
Populated places established in 1601
Cities of district significance in Ukraine